Mispila curvilinea is a species of beetle in the family Cerambycidae. It was described by Francis Polkinghorne Pascoe in 1869. It is known from Laos, Cambodia, India, and China.

References

curvilinea
Beetles described in 1869